Michael Holyfield (born November 18, 1992) is an American professional basketball player for the Hapoel Hevel Modi'in B.C. of the Israeli National League. He played college basketball at Sam Houston State.

High school career
Holyfield attended Manzano High School in Albuquerque, New Mexico. As a junior in 2009–10, he averaged 12.2 points and 10.3 rebounds per game, and helped the Monarchs win the district championship. He started every game as a junior on team with seven seniors, earning second-team All-District honors. As a senior in 2010–11, he led the Monarchs to a 22–9 record, a No. 4 state ranking and the Class AAAAA state finals. He subsequently earned All-State, All-District and All-Metro selection, and was named the district's Defensive Player of the Year.

College career
Holyfield played four seasons of college basketball for Sam Houston State University. He had a minor role over his first two seasons, coming off the bench for much of his freshman and sophomore campaigns and averaging just 15 minutes per game. As a junior in 2013–14, he increased his numbers in every statistical category, averaging 6.5 points, 6.7 rebounds and 1.7 blocks in 17.6 minutes per game, while starting all 35 contests. His 61 blocks was the fourth highest season total at SHSU. He scored in double figures in seven games, including a season-high 20 points against Northwestern State.

As a senior in 2014–15, Holyfield set the school's single-season blocks record with 86 and subsequently earned Southland Conference Defensive Player of the Year honors. He also earned third-team All-Southland Conference honors after averaging 8.5 points, 8.1 rebounds and 2.5 blocks in 17.9 minutes per game, as he started in 34 of 35 games.

Holyfield completed his career as Sam Houston's fourth all-time leader in blocked shots (105) and fifth all-time in rebounds (769).

Professional career

NBA Summer League and preseason
After going undrafted in the 2015 NBA draft, Holyfield joined the Memphis Grizzlies for the 2015 Orlando Summer League. He helped the Grizzlies win the Orlando Summer League title, and over five games for the team, he averaged 6.4 points and 4.2 rebounds in 14.3 minutes per game. He later joined the Boston Celtics for the Las Vegas Summer League, where he appeared in one game. On September 28, 2015, he signed with the Grizzlies, but was later waived by the team on October 7 after appearing in one preseason game.

NBA D-League
On October 31, 2015, Holyfield was acquired by the Iowa Energy of the NBA Development League as an affiliate player of the Grizzlies. He appeared in 22 games for Iowa in 2015–16 before being traded to the Los Angeles D-Fenders on January 29, 2016. In the D-Fenders' regular season finale on April 2, Holyfield had a season-best game with 19 points and 15 rebounds in a 128–121 loss to the Rio Grande Valley Vipers. He helped the D-Fenders reach the 2016 D-League Finals, where they were defeated 2–1 by the Sioux Falls Skyforce. In 24 games for the D-Fenders, he averaged 4.1 points and 3.8 rebounds per game.

Illawarra Hawks
On August 11, 2016, Holyfield signed with the Illawarra Hawks for the 2016–17 NBL season. He made his debut for the Hawks in their season opener on October 7, 2016, recording 14 points, six rebounds and two blocks off the bench in a 122–88 win over the Adelaide 36ers. Holyfield appeared in all 34 games for the Hawks in 2016–17, averaging 4.1 points and 4.0 rebounds per game.

China
In June 2018, Holyfield signed with Hunan Jinjian Miye of the Chinese NBL.

Zhejiang Lions signed Holyfield in April 2020. As the 2020 CBA season was still halted due to the COVID-19 at the time, he discontinued the contract and left the team shortly after.

Greece
Holyfield spent the latter half of the 2020–2021 season with Greek club Ionikos Nikaias.

Israel
In 2021, Holyfield signed with the Israeli basketball team, Hapoel Afula. He recorded 11 points and 12 rebounds in his debut against the Elitzur Ashkelon.

Career statistics

Professional

|-
| align="left" |  2016–17
| align="left" | Illawarra Hawks
| NBL-Australia
| 34 || 11.0 || .557 || 1.000 || .630 || 4.0 || .3 || .2 || .5 || 4.1
|-
| align="left" |  2016–17
| align="left" | Beijing Eastern Buck
| NBL-China
| 24 || 43.4 || .644 || .333 || .540 || 23.6 || 1.0 || 1.0 || 2.2 ||  27.2
|-
| align="left" |  2017–18
| align="left" | Hunan Yongshang
| NBL-China
| 35 || 36.6 || .651 || .000 || .541 || 17.7 || 1.0 || .8 || 1.4 || 18.0
|-
| align="left" |  2018–19
| align="left" | Tauoyuan Pauian
| Taiwan League
| 8 || 21.5 || .574 || .000 || .575 || 10.8 || 1.1 || .4 || 1.0 || 11.6
|-
| align="left" |  2018–19
| align="left" | Beijing Eastern Buck
| NBL-China
| 21 || 42.4 || .621 || .333 || .573 || 21.9 || 1.1 || 1.5 || 1.7 || 24.8
|-
| align="left" |  2018–19
| align="left" | Hong Kong Eastern Long Lions
| ASEAN League
| 10 || 30.9 || .600 || .000 || .569 || 16.4 || .6 || .5 || 2.9 || 15.5
|-
| align="left" |  2019–20
| align="left" | Hong Kong Eastern Long Lions
| ASEAN League
| 10 || 29.2 || .571 || .000 || .500 || 14.6 || .3 || .6 || 2.0 || 12.7
|-
|-class=sortbottom
| align="center" colspan=2 | Career
| All Leagues
| 142 || 30.7 || .626 || .250 || .557 || 15.3 || .8 || .7 || 1.5 || 16.3

References

External links
 Michael Holyfield at hawks.com.au
 Michael Holyfield at nbadleague.com
 Michael Holyfield at gobearkats.com
 Michael Holyfield at washingtonpost.com

1992 births
Living people
American expatriate basketball people in Australia
American expatriate basketball people in China
American expatriate basketball people in Hong Kong
American expatriate basketball people in Taiwan
American men's basketball players
Basketball players from Albuquerque, New Mexico
Centers (basketball)
Eastern Sports Club basketball players
Illawarra Hawks players
Iowa Energy players
Ionikos Nikaias B.C. players
Los Angeles D-Fenders players
Sam Houston Bearkats men's basketball players
South Bay Lakers players
ASEAN Basketball League players
Pauian Archiland basketball players
Super Basketball League imports